Joy Lee Apartment Building and Annex is a historic apartment building located at Carolina Beach, New Hanover County, North Carolina. The original building was built in 1945, and is a two-story, double-pile concrete block building covered with stucco.  It features fanciful concrete balustrades and walls, and an Art Deco-inspired centered portico over the front entryway added in 1957. A two-story double-pile Modern Movement style Annex comprising four apartments was built in 1948.

It was listed on the National Register of Historic Places in 1997.

References

Residential buildings on the National Register of Historic Places in North Carolina
Art Deco architecture in North Carolina
Residential buildings completed in 1945
Buildings and structures in New Hanover County, North Carolina
National Register of Historic Places in New Hanover County, North Carolina
1945 establishments in North Carolina